Route 185 is part of the Trans-Canada Highway. It travels from Saint-Antonin to Saint-Louis-du-Ha! It connects the 2 sections of Autoroute 85 and is the former designation for all of A-85.

The southern section of the highway follows the valley of the Madawaska River.

At present, Route 185 is a 2-lane highway with passing lanes. Often cited as one of the most dangerous highways in Canada, it is slowly being upgraded to Autoroute standards and is eventually planned to be a 4-lane restricted-access freeway, assuming and extending the existing Autoroute 85 designation. Several sections have been completed and opened as such. Once this upgrade is completed, it will close the last gap in what would become a continuous freeway section of the Trans-Canada between Renfrew, Ontario, and Antigonish, Nova Scotia - a length of over 1,500 km (900 mi), and for an even longer interprovincial freeway route between Windsor, Ontario and Halifax, Nova Scotia - a length of about 2,150 km (1,300 mi), roughly playing the same role that the old Quebec Route 2 (which Route 185 was formerly part of) played before its renumbering into several roads in the early-1970s.

Route 185 has been or is being made 4 lanes through most towns along its route.

Currently, there are 2 sections of A-85, the latter from A-20 to Saint-Antonin, and the other from Saint-Louis-du-Ha! Ha! to New Brunswick Route 2 at the provincial border in Degelis, and as of 2016, route 185 no longer connects to New Brunswick route 2 at the provincial border. The opening of the remaining portion in 2025 will also mark the end of Route 185.

Major intersections

See also
 List of Quebec provincial highways

References

External links

Autoroute 85 at motorways-exits.com
 Interactive Provincial Route Map (Transports Québec) 

185
Quebec 185